Jack Kerouac Reads On the Road is a compilation album by American novelist and poet Jack Kerouac, released posthumously on September 14, 1999. The centrepiece of the record is a 28-minute recitation by Kerouac from his book On the Road that was recorded on an acetate disc in the 1950s but thought lost for decades, and had only recently been rediscovered at the time of release. Other tracks feature Kerouac singing renditions of Jazz hits from the 1920s, 1930s and 1940s alongside songs and poems of his own composition.

The album closes with a cover of Kerouac's track "On the Road" (itself included earlier on the disc) performed by Tom Waits with Primus. Video footage of the recording of this track can be seen on the Primus release Videoplasty, and the track itself was later included on the Tom Waits collection Orphans: Brawlers, Bawlers & Bastards, along with a version of the same song titled "Home I'll Never Be".

Track listing

Critical reception

Richie Unterberger, in his review for Allmusic, describes the album as "a worthy collection of Jack Kerouac's narratives and poetry", noting that it is particularly enjoyable to hear Kerouac recite his work "since his prose had much of a jazz rhythm, and since he was an engaging reader/performer himself." Unterberger goes on to say that Kerouac's singing is "unexpected, and amusing if not brilliant".

Personnel

Musicians
Jack Kerouac - Vocals
Andreu Johnny Almendra - Bongos, Drums
David Amram - Percussion, Piano, French Horn
Candido Camero - Conga
Ralph Carney - Saxophone
Les Claypool - Bass, Percussion
Vic Juris - Guitar
Larry LaLonde - Guitar, Percussion
Bryan "Brain" Mantia - Percussion
John Medeski - Organ
Midhat Serbagi - Viola
Jane Taylor - Bassoon
Victor Venegas - Bass
Tom Waits - Vocals, Guitar, Percussion

Other personnel
Douglas Brinkley - Liner Notes
Bernd Burgdorf - Engineer, Mixing
Greg Calbi - Mastering, Digital Transfers
Biff Dawes - Engineer
Steve Fallone - Mastering, Digital Transfers
Robert Frank - Photography
David Greenberg - Photography
Jimmy Harned - Assistant Engineer
Dan Lawrence - Engineer, Mixing
Jerry Newman - Engineer, Mixing
Frank Olinsky - Art Direction, Design
Lee Ranaldo - Producer, Digital Editing
Jim Sampas - Producer, Engineer, Digital Transfers
Sean Slade - Digital Transfers
Jeff Sloan - Engineer
Michael Stipe - Photography

References

Jack Kerouac albums
1999 compilation albums
On the Road